Sembilanbelas November University Kolaka (Indonesian: Universitas Sembilanbelas November Kolaka, abbreviated as USN Kolaka) is a public university in Kolaka, Southeast Sulawesi.

History 
USN Kolaka was formed on November 19th, 1984, and was originally called the Kolaka November 19th Education and Teaching State College (Indonesian: Sekolah Tinggi Keguruan dan Ilmu Pendidikan 19 Nopember Kolaka (STKIP). The date was chosen to commemorate the date of the Kolaka incident. The state college became a university in 2005, based on a decree released by the Indonesian Ministry of Education. It also changed its name to November 19th University Kolaka (Indonesian: Universitas 19 November Kolaka) In Indonesia, the institution became a public university (Indonesian: Perguruan Tinggi Negeri), and from that moment on, the institution is known by its current name, which it has retained since it became a public university.

Logo and philosophy 
The logo of UNS Kolaka comprises several aspects, each with its own meaning:

 Five flower petals, indicating Pancasila.
 A star, indicating the desire and drive to learn and create for the sake of society and scientific development.
 Twenty grains of paddy rice and fourteen pieces of cotton, indicating the year when USN Kolaka became a public university.
 An eagle head with four combs and two wings, indicating the day and month when USN Kolaka became a public university.
 A monument, indicating the historical significance of the university’s name.
 An opened book, indicating the value of science and technology for society.
 A ribbon with university name emblazoned, indicating the unity of the university.

Academics

Faculties 
USN Kolaka has six faculties and thirty programs. Students attending the following programs will receive a bachelor’s degree, with the exception of nursing students, since their program is only at the level of an associate degree. These are the following faculties and programs available at USN Kolaka:

Faculty of Teaching and Education Science 

 Indonesian Language Education
 English Language Education
 Mathematics Education
 Geography Education
 Sports Education
 Pancasila Education
 Biology Education
 Chemistry Education

Faculty of Animal Husbandry and Fisheries 

 Agribusiness
 Agrotechnology
 Fisheries Science
 Animal Husbandry
 Marine Science
 Agricultural Product Technology

Faculty of Science and Technology 

 Mining Engineering
 Civil Engineering
 Chemistry
 Machine Engineering
 Naval Engineering
 Pharmacy
 Nursing

Faculty of Social and Political Science 

 Public Administration
 Management
 Accounting
 Economic Development

Faculty of Law 

 Law

Faculty of Information and Technology 

 Information Science
 Computer Science

Ranking 
According to Webometrics 2021 Report, the university is currently ranked 390th in Indonesia.

References 

Universities in Indonesia